Mourad Karouf (born 27 December 1968) is a retired Algerian football defender and later manager.

References

1968 births
Living people
Algerian footballers
JS Kabylie players
US Chaouia players
USM Blida players
JS Bordj Ménaïel players
CA Batna players
Algerian Ligue Professionnelle 1 players
Algerian Ligue 2 players
Algeria international footballers
Association football defenders
Algerian football managers
JS Kabylie managers
CRB Aïn Fakroun managers
Algerian Ligue Professionnelle 1 managers
21st-century Algerian people